Pravrajika Bhaktiprana (October 1920 – 11 December 2022) was an Indian Hindu sannyasini and the fourth president of the Sri Sarada Math and Ramakrishna Sarada Mission, Dakshineswar, in Kolkata, India. She took over as president of the institution on 2 April 2009. In her name "Pravrajika" means "mendicant nun" and the suffix to her name Bhakti is 'prana' which means "who is devoted to".

Biography
Bhaktiprana was born in Calcutta (now Kolkata) in October 1920. She did her school education from the Gouri Ma's Saradeswari Ashram in Calcutta. Right from a very young age her interest was towards spirituality, and she was associated with the monks of the Belur Math of the Ramakrishna Math and Ramakrishna Mission. She initially trained as a nurse. In 1950, she was employed as a nurse at the Matri Bhavan, a hospital that was under the Ramakrishna Sarada Mission in Tollygunge.

Bhaktiprana was given oath of  Mantra Diksha by Swami Vijnanananda, who was a disciple of Sri Ramakrishna, and was then also the fourth president of Ramakrishna Math and Mission and was given the oath of Brahmacharya in 1953 by Swami Shankarananda. She was made a sanyasini in 1959 by Swami Shankarananda, the president of Ramakrishna Math at that time. She was given the trusteeship of the Sri Sarada Math in 1959. In  1959 itself the math had been  given an independent identity. In 1960, she became a member of the governing body of the Ramakrishna Sarada Mission. When Matri Bhavan hospital, a 10-bed maternity care centre  where she had worked as a nurse came under the control of Ramakrishna Sarada Mission following its transfer from the Ramakrishna Mission she was appointed its secretary. Under her leadership the hospital has now expanded into a 100-bedded modern hospital facility from an earlier 10-bed maternity care centre. In December 1998, she got elected to the post of vice president of the Sri Sarada Math and Ramakrishna Sarada Mission. On 13 October 2003 as vice president she was a special invitee for the inauguration of the Vedanta Centre at Pangot. Following the death of Pravrajika Shraddhaprana in February 2009, she took over as president of the mission in April 2009. On assuming this position she said "All my life, I have tried to live for others. That’s what Ma [Sarada Devi] would’ve wanted me to do... Without Ma’s blessings, we are nothing."

Bhaktiprana died on 11 December 2022, at the age of 102.

References

External links
 Sarada Math website

1920 births
2022 deaths
Place of birth missing
20th-century Hindu religious leaders
Educators from West Bengal
Female missionaries
Indian centenarians
Indian Hindu missionaries
Indian Hindu nuns
Indian women religious leaders
Scholars from Kolkata
Women centenarians
Women educators from West Bengal